This is a list of noise rock bands.

0–9
 '68

A
 AIDS Wolf
 An Albatross
 Arab on Radar
 The Armed
 The Austerity Program

B
 Babes in Toyland
 Barkmarket
 Big Black
 The Birthday Party
 Black Eyes 
 Black Midi
 Blind Idiot God
 The Blood Brothers
 The Body
 Bodychoke
 Boredoms
 Boris
 Brainbombs
 Brainiac
 The Butthole Surfers

C
 Carsick Cars
 Casper Brötzmann
 Chat Pile
 Cherubs
 The Chinese Stars
  Chrome
 Cows
 Crass

D
 Daughters
 Dazzling Killmen
 The Dead C
 Death from Above
 Deerhoof
 Deerhunter
 Dinosaur Jr.
 Distorted Pony
 DNA
 Drive Like Jehu
 DZ Deathrays

E
 Ed Hall
 The Ex

F
 Feedtime
 The Flaming Lips
 Flipper
 The Flying Luttenbachers
 Foot Village
 Fugazi
 Fushitsusha

G
 Gilla Band
 godheadSilo
 Gonjasufi
 Gore
 Grong Grong
 Glenn Branca
 Guerilla Toss

H
 Hair Police
 Half Japanese
 Halo of Flies
 Health
Hella
 Helmet
 High Rise

I
 Itchy-O

J
 The Jesus and Mary Chain
 The Jesus Lizard
 johnboy
 Just Mustard

K
 KEN Mode
 Killdozer

L
 Les Rallizes Denudes
 Live Skull
 Liars
 Lightning Bolt
 The Locust
 Lou Reed
 LSD March

M
 Magik Markers
 Massacre
 mclusky
 Melt-Banana
 Melkbelly
 Melvins
 The Membranes
 The Microphones
 Thurston Moore
 Michael Gira

N,O
 Nirvana
 No Age
 No Trend
 Osees
 Oxbow

P
 Pain Teens
 The Paper Chase
 Part Chimp
 A Place to Bury Strangers
 The Plot to Blow Up the Eiffel Tower
 Polvo
 The Psychic Paramount
 Pussy Galore
 Pyrrhon

R
 Ramleh
 Rapeman
 Red Krayola
 Replicator
 Royal Trux
 Ruins

S
 Scratch Acid
 Shellac
 Shorty
 Show Me the Body
 Six Finger Satellite
 Skullflower
 Slint
 Slug
 Sonic Youth
 Steel Pole Bath Tub
 Steve Albini
 The Stooges
 Swans

T
 Tar
 Teenage Jesus and the Jerks
 Thinking Fellers Union Local 282
 This Heat
 Tropical Fuck Storm
 Today Is the Day
 Ty Segall

U
 Uboa
 Uniform
 Unsane
 Unwound
 Uzi
 U.S. Maple
 The U-Men

V
 The Velvet Underground

W
 White Zombie
 Whores

Z
 Zeni Geva
 Zs

References

Noise rock